Edwin "Eddie" Williams (1 July 1898 – 31 January 1983) was a Welsh dual-code international rugby union, and professional rugby league footballer who played in the 1920s.

Background
Eddie Williams was born in Cwmllynfell, Wales, and he died aged 84 in Swansea, Wales.

International honours
Eddie Williams won caps for Wales (RU) while at Neath RFC in 1924 against New Zealand, and in 1925 against France, and won a cap for Wales (RL) while at Huddersfield in the 15–39 defeat by England at White City Stadium, Sloper Road, Grangetown, Cardiff on Wednesday 14 November 1928.

References

1898 births
1983 deaths
Dual-code rugby internationals
Huddersfield Giants players
Neath RFC players
Rugby league five-eighths
Rugby league players from Neath Port Talbot
Rugby union fly-halves
Rugby union players from Cwmllynfell
Swansea RFC players
Wales international rugby union players
Wales national rugby league team players
Welsh rugby league players
Welsh rugby union players